Tepa Reinikainen (born 16 March 1976 in Kangasniemi, Southern Savonia) is a Finnish shot putter. His personal best put is 20.88 metres, achieved in July 2001 in Lapinlahti.

Achievements

External links

1976 births
Living people
People from Kangasniemi
Finnish male shot putters
Athletes (track and field) at the 2004 Summer Olympics
Olympic athletes of Finland
Sportspeople from South Savo
20th-century Finnish people
21st-century Finnish people